"Be Free" is the sixth single released by Mexican singer Belinda, taken from her debut album Belinda.

Information 
It reached an unexpected #3 in Mexico, #62 in Slovenia and #99 in Bosnia and Herzegovina. Belinda was the first Mexican artist who released a song in English and entered the Yugoslav charts. This song was written mostly to introduce Belinda to an English speaking audience, but the attempt failed; however she later achieved this by starring in the Disney Channel original movie The Cheetah Girls 2.

Track list 
CD Single
 Be Free

References 

2005 singles
Belinda Peregrín songs
Pop ballads
2003 songs
Songs written by Belinda Peregrín
English-language Mexican songs
Song recordings produced by Graeme Pleeth